"Cemetery" is a single by the Australian alternative rock band Silverchair. The song is found on the band's second album Freak Show. It was also included on their Best of Volume 1.

In their review for Freak Show, Rolling Stone called the song a "proggy" ballad.

Background
"Cemetery" was originally composed by frontman Daniel Johns as a solo acoustic piece while still living at home. Originally, Johns had no intention of including it on a Silverchair album. In interviews, he revealed that he was initially apprehensive about presenting "Cemetery" even to his bandmates due to its soft and delicate nature, fearing that he would be ridiculed for creating a ballad. However, once Johns played the solo acoustic recording for his bandmates, they enjoyed it immensely, and Johns then felt confident enough to include it on Freak Show.

Covers
The song was covered by The Brave on the Silverchair tribute album Spawn (Again): A Tribute to Silverchair.

Track listing
Australian CD single (MATTCD052)
12" ltd. promo vinyl (MATTV052)
 Ltd. cassette (MATT0052)
 "Cemetery"
 "Slab" (Nicklaunoise mix)
 "Cemetery" (acoustic)

European CD single (6645342)
 "Cemetery"
 "Freak (Remix for Us Rejects)"
 "Undecided"

Charts

Certifications

References

1997 singles
Silverchair songs
1990s ballads
Songs written by Daniel Johns
Song recordings produced by Nick Launay
1997 songs
Alternative rock ballads